Ira Bowman Thompson (April 9, 1889 – August 10, 1973) was a politician, Ku Klux Klan leader, and attorney from the U.S. state of Alabama.

Thompson was born to Albert and Laura (née Crabtree) Thompson at Bay Minette, Alabama in 1889. After attending school in Bay Minette, Thompson attended the University of Alabama and Meridian College in Mississippi, graduating from the latter in 1910. Thompson then entered into military service, eventually becoming Captain of Company B of the 1st Alabama Infantry in 1915. He also served a brief term in the Alabama House of Representatives as a representative for Baldwin County in that same year. He was admitted to the bar in 1916 but he was quickly called into federal military service in 1917 when he was sent to France in 1918 to command a Prisoner of War camp until the prisoners were repatriated back to Germany in 1919. After his return to the United States, Thompson opened a law practice in Luverne, Alabama and arranged Battery A of the 141st Field Artillery in the National Guard, which he would later resign from in 1932.

Thompson was an active member of the local Ku Klux Klan organization in Crenshaw County and Luverne in the late 1920s, serving as the exalted cyclops of the Crenshaw KKK around 1927 and 1928. In October 1927, Thompson, along with 35 other suspected Klansmen were all indicted by the Crenshaw County grand jury on the basis of their participation of floggings throughout the county. The case, however was dropped later in December by the attorney general's withdrawal on his belief that the state police had assisted the Klan. Less than a year after Thompson's indictment, Governor Bibb Graves appointed him the prosecuting attorney of Crenshaw County.

In 1927, Thompson was appointed solicitor of Luverne, and was re-elected to two more consecutive terms in 1928 and 1932. He was called back to active military service in 1942 when he was a captain in the military police corps. He had previously served as the attorney for Crenshaw County since 1941. He sat once again in the Alabama House of Representatives, this time for Crenshaw County as a Democrat from 1943 until  1951.

Thompson married Eugenia Marie Little in 1917. They had one child, Mary Eugenia. He was an active community member, sitting on the state athletic commission, Luverne's education board, founding the Lurverne Bank and Trust Company, and serving as a member in the local Lion's Club, Red Cross and American Legion. He also taught Sunday school at his church for over 30 years. He died in 1973 in Luverne.

References

1889 births
1973 deaths
People from Bay Minette, Alabama
Members of the Alabama House of Representatives
American Ku Klux Klan members
University of Alabama alumni
United States Army officers
20th-century American politicians
People from Luverne, Alabama
Southern Methodists
American United Methodists
20th-century Methodists